Željko Nimš (born 22 April 1950) is a Croatian handball player who competed in the 1976 Summer Olympics for Yugoslavia.

In 1976 he was part of the Yugoslav team which finished fifth in the Olympic tournament. He played three matches.

He was a part of RK Bjelovar squad (at the time called Partizan) that won European Champions's Cup against West German squad VfL Gummersbach, in a game played in Dortmund.

Honours
Partizan Bjelovar
Yugoslav First League (6): 1967–68, 1969–70, 1970–71, 1971–72, 1976–77, 1978–79
Yugoslav Cup (2): 1968, 1976
European Champions Cup (1): 1971–72

Pallamano Trieste
Serie A (1): 1985-86

Yugoslavia
1974 World Championship - 3rd place
1976 Summer Olympics - 5th place
1978 World Championship - 4th place

External links
 sports-reference.com profile
 RK Bjelovar 

1950 births
Living people
Yugoslav male handball players
Croatian male handball players
Olympic handball players of Yugoslavia
Handball players at the 1976 Summer Olympics
People from Sisak